I'm an Explosive is a 1933 British comedy film directed by Adrian Brunel and starring William Hartnell, Gladys Jennings and Eliot Makeham. In the film, the son of an inventor is believed to have accidentally drunk an explosive liquid.

Production
The film was a Quota quickie made at Nettlefold Studios in Walton-on-Thames by the producer George Smith and distributed by Fox, enabling it to meet the annual quota for handling British films imposed by the government. It was based on a novel by Gordon Phillips. Despite its low budget and short running time the film proved a considerable hit with audiences on its general release.

Cast
 William Hartnell as Edward Whimperley
 Gladys Jennings as Anne Pannell
 Eliot Makeham as Professor Whimperly
 D. A. Clarke-Smith as Lord Ferndale
 Sybil Grove as Miss Harriman
 Harry Terry as Mould
 George Dillon as Shilling
 Adele Blanche as French Girl

References

Bibliography
 Chibnall, Steve. Quota Quickies: The Birth of the British 'B' film. British Film Institute, 2007.
 Low, Rachael. History of the British Film: Filmmaking in 1930s Britain. George Allen & Unwin, 1985.

External links

1933 films
1933 comedy films
British comedy films
Films shot at Nettlefold Studios
Films directed by Adrian Brunel
Films based on British novels
Films set in London
Films set in England
British black-and-white films
1930s English-language films
1930s British films
Quota quickies